De Young or DeYoung may refer to:

People
Bailey De Young, American actress
Charles de Young, American journalist and businessman
Cliff DeYoung, American actor and musician
Dennis DeYoung, American rock musician
Frederic R. DeYoung, American politician
Karen DeYoung, American journalist
Liam de Young, Australian field hockey player
Mary de Young, American professor of sociology
Michael Henry de Young, American journalist and businessman

Other
134244 De Young, a main-belt asteroid
DeYoung, former name of Calumet Park, Illinois, US
DeYoung Family Zoo, a zoological park in Wallace, Michigan, US
M. H. de Young Memorial Museum, a fine art museum in Golden Gate Park, San Francisco, California, US
Park de Young, a former name of Mosaic Stadium at Taylor Field, in Regina, Saskatchewan, Canada

See also
De Jong